Shweta Chaudhry (born 3 July 1986) is an Indian sport shooter who competes in the 10 metre air pistol and 25 metre sports pistol events.

In 2014, at the 2014 Asian Games in Incheon, Chaudhary won the bronze medal in the women's air pistol event, having scored 176.4 points in the final, which was the first medal won by India in the games.

In 2009, at 2009 Asian Air Gun Championships in Doha, Chaudhary won a bronze medal in air pistol event having 381 points in the final.

Career 
Chaudhary has been a practicing shooter since 1997 when she was in 5th standard. Within a year, she made it to the senior national team. In 2000, at the age of 14, she became the senior national champion with a record breaking results. She played for Haryana state until she was supported by ONGC in 2006. Chaudhary, along with Sheila Kanungo, won a silver medal at the 2002 Commonwealth Games held in Manchester.

Chaudhary's other notable achievements include winning a silver medal (team) at the 15th Asian Games in 2006. She also won an individual bronze medal at the Asian Games held at Incheon in 2014. She won an individual silver medal at the 8th Asian Airgun Shooting Championship in New Delhi, India in September 2015. 
 
Chaudhary is six-time national champion in air pistol and has accumulated about 117 national and 43 international medals, including 3 gold medals at the SAF Games 2004 in Pakistan, 3 gold medals at the 8th Commonwealth Shooting championship at New Delhi in 2010, where she won an individual gold medal, an individual badge medal, and a and pair event with Pushpanjali Rana. She won 2 gold medals (individual and team) at the 12th SAF Games 2016 in Guwahati, India. She has been supported by Olympic Gold Quest.

Award
In 2004, the government of Haryana accredited Chaudhary with the Bhim Award for excellence in pistol shooting.

References

1986 births
Living people
Sportswomen from Haryana
Indian female sport shooters
Asian Games medalists in shooting
Shooters at the 2002 Asian Games
Shooters at the 2006 Asian Games
Shooters at the 2014 Asian Games
Commonwealth Games gold medallists for India
Commonwealth Games silver medallists for India
Commonwealth Games medallists in shooting
21st-century Indian women
21st-century Indian people
Sport shooters from Haryana
Asian Games silver medalists for India
Asian Games bronze medalists for India
Medalists at the 2006 Asian Games
Medalists at the 2014 Asian Games
Shooters at the 2002 Commonwealth Games
South Asian Games gold medalists for India
Universiade medalists for India
Universiade medalists in shooting
South Asian Games medalists in shooting
Medallists at the 2002 Commonwealth Games